Soe Win (born 1 March 1961) is a Burmese army general and current Deputy Prime Minister of Myanmar following the formation of the caretaker government on 1 August 2021. He also serves as vice chairman of the State Administration Council, deputy commander-in-chief of the Tatmadaw (Myanmar armed forces) and commander-in-chief of the Myanmar Army. He is also a member of Myanmar's National Defence and Security Council. In May 2012, former president of Myanmar Thein Sein appointed him to the working committee of the government team responsible for negotiating with Myanmar's many armed ethnic rebel groups. Soe Win is a close associate of former vice chairman of the SPDC, Vice-Senior General Maung Aye.

Early life and education
Soe Win was born in 1961 to Chit Sein and Kyin Htwe. In 1976, he attended a cadet course at the Defense Services Academy, alongside Ye Htut, graduating with distinctions in military science and literature. He graduated as part of the 22nd intake in 1981.

Military career
In 1981, Soe Win graduated from the Defense Services Academy (DSA) during its 22nd intake. In June 2008, he became the commander of the Northern Regional Command of the Myanmar Army in Kachin State. In August 2010, he became Chief of the Bureau of Special Operations-6 (BSO-6), which oversees military operations in Chin and Rakhine States and the Magwe Region.

Soe Win had also pressured the Kachin Independence Army (KIA) to convert into a "Border Guard Force" (BGF) under the control of the military. Despite numerous meetings between Soe win and KIA leaders in July 2009 and August 2010, the KIA did not become a BGF.

In September 2011, the Kachin Independence Army (KIA) accused Soe Win of ordering Tatmadaw soldiers to attack KIA positions in Kachin State, thus violating the terms of multiple ceasefire agreements signed prior to the alleged attacks. Soe Win denied the claims, saying that neither he nor anyone else in the Northern Regional Command had ordered an attack on the KIA.

Accusations of corruption
Soe Win has been accused of being involved numerous cases of corruption and extortion during his career as commander of the Northern Regional Command from 2008 to 2010. He has been accused of accepting bribes from companies dealing in jade, timber, and gold, in exchange for concessions from the profits. He was reported to have accepted a 150 million kyat ($149,254 USD) bribe from teak businessmen from China's Yunnan Province, in exchange for allowing illicit teak trade on the Myanmar-China border. In March 2010, he ordered Tatmadaw soldiers in Hpakant, Kachin State, to collect military taxes from local jade mining companies.

Sanctions
The U.S. Department of the Treasury has imposed sanctions on Soe Win since 10 December 2019, pursuant to Executive Order 13818, which builds upon and implements the Global Magnitsky Human Rights Accountability Act and targets perpetrators of serious human rights abuse and corruption. He has committed serious human rights abuse against members of ethnic minority groups across Myanmar. These US sanctions include a freezing of assets under the US and a ban on transactions with any US person.

About one year later on 11 February 2021, he was also placed on the sanctions list of the OFAC pursuant to Executive Order 14014, in response to the Burmese military’s coup against the democratically elected civilian government of Burma.

The Government of Canada has imposed sanctions on him since 18 February 2021, pursuant to Special Economic Measures Act and Special Economic Measures (Burma) Regulations, in response to the gravity of the human rights and humanitarian situation in Myanmar (formerly Burma). Canadian sanctions include a freezing of assets under Canada and a ban on transactions with any Canadian person.

Furthermore, the Council of the European Union has imposed sanctions on him since 22 March 2021, pursuant to Council Regulation (EU) 2021/479 and Council Implementing Regulation (EU) 2021/480 which amended Council Regulation (EU) No 401/2013, for his responsibility for the military coup and the subsequent military and police repression against peaceful demonstrators. The EU sanctions include a freezing of assets under member countries of the EU and a ban on entry or transit to the countries.

Personal life
Soe Win is married to Than Than Nwe (b. 1954).

References

1961 births
Burmese generals
Burmese military personnel
Deputy Prime Ministers of Myanmar
Defence Services Academy alumni
Living people
People sanctioned under the Magnitsky Act
Recipients of the Order of the Union of Myanmar
Members of the State Administration Council
21st-century Burmese politicians
Specially Designated Nationals and Blocked Persons List
Individuals related to Myanmar sanctions